Liparura is a genus of earwigs within the family Forficulidae.

Species 

 Liparura charlottea 
 Liparura debrepaniensis 
 Liparura dentata 
 Liparura kamengensis 
 Liparura montuosa 
 Liparura punctata 
 Liparura serrata 
 Liparura simplex 
 Liparura sinensis 
 Liparura tegminata

References 

Forficulidae
Dermaptera genera